The Loyola Marymount Lions baseball team represents Loyola Marymount University, in Los Angeles, CA in college baseball. The program is classified in the NCAA Division I, and the team competes in the West Coast Conference. The team is currently coached by Nathan Choate, although there are hopes former coach Jason Gill may return in the future.

The Lions have been to the College World Series once, in 1986, and also recorded 9 NCAA appearances, and 10 West Coast Conference Championships (three Championship Series and seven regular season).

, 105 Major League Baseball draft players from LMU have been selected in the Draft. More than 34 players from the school have reached the majors including C. J. Wilson, Scott McGregor, Trevor Megill & David Fletcher (baseball).

Facilities
The Lions play home games at George C. Page Stadium, a 1,200-seat stadium which has been home to the program since 1983.

References